= Church of St. Nicholas, Čelebići (Foča) =

Church of St. Nicholas
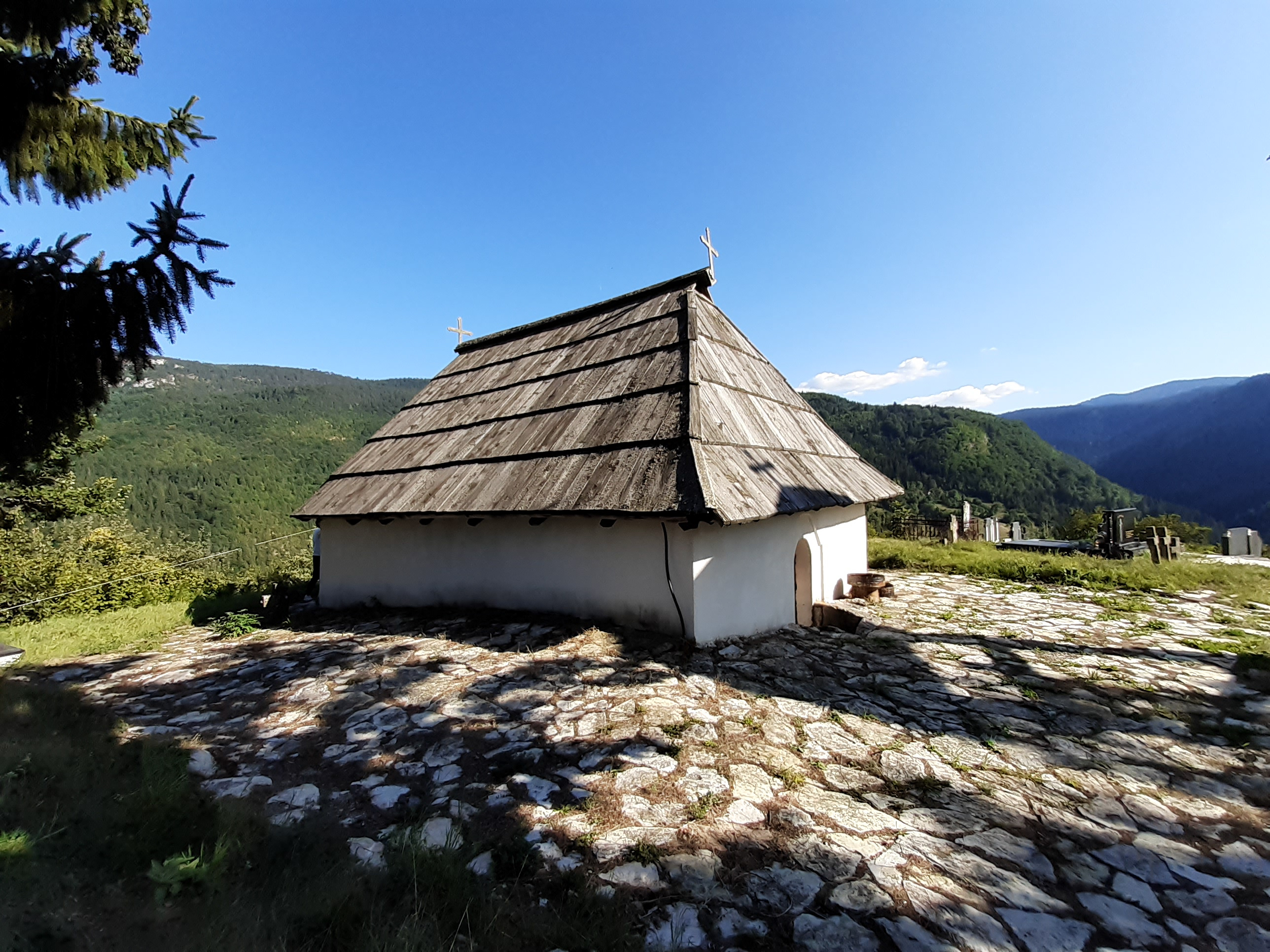
- Church of St. Nicholas
- 43°23′28″N 18°57′49″E
- Denomination: Serbian Orthodox

Church of St. Nicholas (Serbian: Црква Светог Николе у Челебићима) is a temple of the Serbian Orthodox Church, located in Rijeka, Republika Srpska, Foca Municipality. The temple belongs to the Metropolitanate of Dabar-Bosnia. The temple is dedicated to Saint Nicholas of Myra and was built in 1834.

It is a national monument of Bosnia and Herzegovina.
